Kharestan-e Sofla (also Romanized as Khārestān-e Soflá; also known as Khār sūn Soflá) is a village in Howmeh Rural District, in the Central District of Behbahan County, Khuzestan Province, Iran. At the 2006 census, its population was 146, in 35 families.

References 

Populated places in Behbahan County